The New Zealand Football Championship's 2013–14 season (known as the ASB Premiership  for sponsorship reasons) will be the tenth season of the NZFC since its establishment in 2004. The home and away season will begin on 10 November 2013 with the final scheduled to be on 16 March 2014. Auckland City and Waitakere United will represent the ASB Premiership in the 2013–14 OFC Champions League after finishing Champions and Runners-up respectively in the 2012–13 competition. Two franchises have had changes to the clubs branding for this season, with Otago United changing to Southern United and Waikato FC changing to Waibop United. YoungHeart Manawatu has been replaced with Wanderers SC, which aims to give young football players top level matches under the New Zealand Football High Performance Strategy.

Clubs

Regular season

League table

Fixtures and results

Round 1

Round 2

Round 3

Round 4

Round 5

Round 6

Round 7

Round 8

 Due to a breach of player eligibility regulations, the match between Wanderers SC and Hawke's Bay United on 12 January – originally a 1–3 win to Hawke's Bay United – has been awarded as a 3–0 win to Wanderers SC.

Round 9

Round 5 Catch Up

Round 10

Round 11

Round 1 Catch Up

Round 6 Catch Up

Round 12

Round 13

Round 14

Positions by round

Finals

Semi-finals – first leg

Semi-finals – second leg

Final

Season statistics

Leading goalscorers
Updated to end of Round 13

Own goals
Updated to end of Round 7

Notes

ASB Premiership Monthly Awards

References

External links
 NZFC Website

New Zealand Football Championship seasons
1
New
New